Sir Dominick John Chilcott  (born 17 November 1959) is a British diplomat  who is Ambassador to Turkey.

Early life 
He went to the Catholic independent school, St Joseph's College, Ipswich, later also attended by his brother Martin. He attended Greyfriars, Oxford, a small Oxford permanent private hall that closed in June 2008. He gained a BA in Philosophy and Theology in 1982.

Career 
Chilcott joined the Foreign and Commonwealth Office (FCO) in 1982. From 1993–95 he was based in Lisbon. From 1998–2002 he worked in External Relations in Brussels at the Permanent Representation of the United Kingdom to the European Union. From 2003–06 he was Director of the EU Directorate.

In 2006, he became the High Commissioner to Sri Lanka. He met the Queen as High Commissioner on 29 June 2006. From 2008–11 he was Deputy Head of Mission to the United States.

Chilcott briefly became Ambassador to Iran in 2011 before diplomatic relations were suspended, and then Ambassador to Ireland in 2012. He was replaced in 2016 and in September 2017 the FCO announced that he was to be ambassador to Turkey from January 2018. He took up the post on 17 January 2018.

Personal life 
Chilcott married Jane Bromage in 1983. They have three sons and one daughter. He met his wife at Oxford. He was appointed CMG in 2003 and knighted KCMG in the 2018 New Year Honours.

References

External links 
 British Embassy in Ireland
 British Embassy in Ireland at Flickr

Video clips

Offices held 

1959 births
Living people
People educated at St Joseph's College, Ipswich
Alumni of Greyfriars, Oxford
High Commissioners of the United Kingdom to Sri Lanka
High Commissioners of the United Kingdom to the Maldives
Ambassadors of the United Kingdom to Iran
Ambassadors of the United Kingdom to Ireland
Ambassadors of the United Kingdom to Turkey
Knights Commander of the Order of St Michael and St George